The 12th African Championships in Athletics were held in Algiers, Algeria between 12 and 15 July 2000 at the Stade 5 Juillet 1962.

Men's results

Field

Women's results

Track

Field

Medal table

See also
2000 in athletics (track and field)

External links
Results – GBR Athletics

 
African Championships in Athletics
A
African Championships in Athletics
African Championships in Athletics
Sport in Algiers
20th century in Algiers
International athletics competitions hosted by Algeria